Stef Krul (born 15 July 1995) is a Dutch racing cyclist, who currently rides for Dutch amateur team NWV Groningen.

Personal life
Away from cycling, Krul is studying for an econometrics degree.

Major results

2013
 2nd Time trial, National Junior Road Championships
 2nd Omloop der Vlaamse Gewesten
 3rd Overall Internationale Niedersachsen-Rundfahrt der Junioren
1st Stage 2 (ITT)
 5th Overall Sint-Martinusprijs Kontich
 6th Overall Keizer der Juniores
 6th Omloop Mandel-Leie-Schelde Juniors
2014
 1st Stage 1 (TTT) Czech Cycling Tour
 6th Zuid Oost Drenthe Classic I
 8th Time trial, National Under-23 Road Championships
2016
 8th Time trial, National Under-23 Road Championships
2017
 National Under-23 Road Championships
2nd Road race
6th Time trial
 3rd ZODC Zuidenveld Tour
 10th Overall Olympia's Tour
2018
 1st PWZ Zuidenveld Tour
2019
 3rd Overall Tour du Loir-et-Cher
 3rd Overall Flèche du Sud
 6th Overall Tour de Normandie
 6th Overall Kreiz Breizh Elites
 7th Overall Rhône-Alpes Isère Tour

References

External links

1995 births
Living people
Dutch male cyclists
Cyclists from Friesland
21st-century Dutch people
20th-century Dutch people
Sportspeople from Leeuwarden